Illinois Route 121 (IL 121) is a  major state highway in the central part of the U.S. state of Illinois. Although it travels from northwest to southeast, it is marked as a north–south highway. It travels from IL 130 in Greenup (very near U.S. Route 40) to Interstate 55 (I-55) in Lincoln at the interchange of I-55 and IL 10.

Route description 
IL 121 travels north from Greenup near I-70. While traveling northwest, IL 121 travels through Toledo and has an interchange with I-57 in Mattoon.

From there, it travels northwest into the city limits of Decatur but largely goes around downtown using 22nd Street and Pershing Road. On the northwest side of Decatur, IL 121 intersects with the concurrent I-72 and US 51.

IL 121 continues further northwest into Lincoln, where it has a concurrency with IL 10 through Lincoln as Keokuk Street and Woodlawn Road before terminating at I-55 just south of I-155. IL 10 continues west on the same road.

History 

State Bond Issue (SBI) Route 121 formerly traveled from Peoria to the Indiana state line east of Chrisman. When US 36 was established in the late 1920s, IL 121 was dropped east of Decatur. In March 1937, IL 121 replaced then IL 131 and IL 132 south of Decatur to Greenup.

In 1993, I-155 north of Lincoln was completed. IL 121 was then dropped from this stretch of freeway.

IL 121 had a business route through Decatur until about 1980 along Main Street and Water Street. This was replaced by US 51 Business.

Major intersections

See also

References

External links

121
Transportation in Cumberland County, Illinois
Transportation in Coles County, Illinois
Transportation in Macon County, Illinois
Transportation in Logan County, Illinois
U.S. Route 36
U.S. Route 51
Transportation in Moultrie County, Illinois